Węglewo  is a village in the administrative district of Gmina Pobiedziska, within Poznań County, Greater Poland Voivodeship, in west-central Poland.

The village has a church which lies on the Wooden Churches Trail around Puszcza Zielonka.

References

Villages in Poznań County